Mitchell Burgess is an American writer and producer. He was the writer and an executive producer on The Sopranos. He was a creator and executive producer for Blue Bloods. He frequently works with his wife Robin Green.

Career
The Sopranos, Northern Exposure and Mr. & Mrs. Smith are some of the TV series that he has written for.

In 2010 Burgess worked as an executive consultant and writer on the second season of the police drama Southland. Green and Burgess were the creators of Blue Bloods, which premiered in fall 2010 on CBS.

Personal life
Burgess is married to his Sopranos co-writer Robin Green, whom he met when they were students at the University of Iowa.

Awards
He has been nominated for eleven Emmy Awards for The Sopranos and has won three.

References

External links 

American television writers
American male television writers
American television producers
University of Iowa alumni
Living people
Writers Guild of America Award winners
Place of birth missing (living people)
Year of birth missing (living people)
Primetime Emmy Award winners
Showrunners